William Ernest Andrews III (born July 10, 1952) is an American politician. First serving in the Mississippi House of Representatives as a Democrat from 1977 to 1984, he sought election again as a Republican in 2019. He resigned effective March 31, 2020.

References

External links

1952 births
Living people
Republican Party members of the Mississippi House of Representatives
People from Hattiesburg, Mississippi
People from Lamar County, Mississippi